Sand On Seven is the debut of album of Australian indie band Not From There. The album received warm critical reception and won the ARIA Award for Best Adult Alternative Album at the ARIA Music Awards of 1999.. "Sich Offnen" and "Abgedroschen" are sung entirely in lead singer Heinz Riegler's native tongue, German.

Track listing
  "Hurricane Charlie" - 2:22  
  "Juanita's Cocktail Party" - 4:12  
  "Neurons" - 6:54  
  "The Corkscrew" - 3:58  
  "N" - 4:57  
  "Sich Offnen" - 3:49  
  "A Loser's Plea and the World's Weather" - 4:02  
  "What is Better Now" - 6:00  
  "Abgedroschen" - 3:59  
  "The Orb f Discomfort" - 1:52  
  "Three Words Repeated" - 5:00

References

1998 albums
ARIA Award-winning albums